Panfilov may refer to:

People
Gleb Panfilov, Russian film director
Ivan Panfilov, Soviet World War II general
Vyacheslav Panfilov, Ukrainian footballer
Yevgeni Panfilov (disambiguation)

Places
Panfilov, former name of Zharkent, a town in Kazakhstan
Panfilov, Pavlodar Region, Kazakhstan
Panfilov, Kyrgyzstan, a village in Chuy Region, Kyrgyzstan
Panfilov District (disambiguation)
Panfilov Peak in the Tian Shan